The following is a list of international bilateral treaties between Australia and Belgium

 Early treaties were extended to Australia by the British Empire, however they are still generally in force.
 Later European Union treaties excluded from this list

References

Treaties of Australia
Treaties of Belgium
European-Australian culture